Chesnonia is a monospecific genus of ray-finned fish belonging to the subfamily Brachyopsinae in the family Agonidae. Its only species is Chesnonia verrucosa, the warty poacher, which is found in the northeastern Pacific Ocean where it occurs from Bristol Bay and Unimak Island in Alaska south to Point Montara in California. This species grows to a length of  TL.

References

Brachyopsinae
Monotypic fish genera
Fish described in 1880
Taxa named by William Neale Lockington